Madge Knight (1895 in England – 1974 in Bagni di Lucca, Italy) was an English artist. She married the American artist Charles Howard in the 1930s. She lived in London with her husband until 1940, after which they moved to San Francisco for six years, because of the advent of World War Two. While in San Francisco she studied and shared ideas with the Howard family and other progressive's. Her artwork is considered abstract and she was involved with the surrealist movement while living in San Francisco. After the war she traveled between the US and Europe and shared ideas about modern art in these regions. She died in Bagni di Lucca Italy in 1974. Several of her works are in collections at the San Francisco Museum of Modern Art and the Fine Arts Museums of San Francisco.

References

1895 births
1974 deaths
20th-century English women artists
British expatriates in the United States